Macrosoma albimacula is moth-like butterfly described by William Warren in 1900. It belongs to the family Hedylidae. Originally it belonged to the genus Hyphedyle.

Distribution
The species is found in the west and north of Ecuador (Paramba of Imbabura Province) and central Peru at altitudes up to 1,630 m.

Description

Male

Wings
Male M. albimacula specimens have wings of a greyish brown colour. The forewing has a dark and hardly excavated apex. The costa, the leading edge of the wing is pale in color. There is a prominent white patch at the distal end of the cell with a minute white blip towards the costa.
The length of the forewing is 19–20 mm.

Genitalia
Following are the characteristics of the genitalia:
 Gnathos is broad and denticulate, with medial tongue-shaped lobe which is very short, weakly sclerotized and not down curved.
 Valva is subtriangular.

Antenna
The antenna is not bipectinate.

Diagnosis
The wing colour is most similar to that of M. subornata but the discrete costal marking of that species is absent from M. albimacula. The genitalia are very similar to those of M. leucophasiata and M. amaculata although the shape of the valva differs, but the differences in wing markings of the species are pronounced.

References
 Macrosoma albimacula - Overview - Encyclopedia of Life.
 Catalogue of Life.
 A catalogue of the Hedylidae (Lepidoptera: Hedyloidea), with descriptions of two new species.
  An identification guide to the Hedylidae (Lepidoptera: Hedyloidea).

Sources

Hedylidae
Butterflies described in 1900
Taxa named by William Warren (entomologist)
Hedylidae of South America